Costa Rica competed at the 1980 Summer Olympics in Moscow, USSR.

Results by event

Archery
In its second archery competition at the Olympics, Costa Rica again entered two men.

Men's Individual Competition:
Juan Wedel — 2146 points (→ 35th place)
Jorge Murillo — 2127 points (→ 36th place)

Football

Preliminary round (group D)

July 21, 1980
Costa Rica - Iraq 0-3 (0-1) Republican Stadium, Kyiv

July 23, 1980
Yugoslavia - Costa Rica 3-2 (2-1) Dinamo Stadium, Minsk

July 25, 1980
Finland - Costa Rica 3-0 (1-0) Republican Stadium, Kyiv

Final standings group D

 Yugoslavia 3 2 1 0 ( 6- 3) 5 *
 Iraq 3 1 2 0 ( 4- 1) 4 *
 Finland 3 1 1 1 ( 3- 2) 3
 Costa Rica 3 0 0 3 ( 2- 9) 0

 Qualified for quarter-finals

Team roster

Head coach:  Antonio Moyano

Swimming
Women's 100m Butterfly
Maria del Milagro Paris
 Final — 1.02,89 (→ 7th place)

References
Official Olympic Reports

Nations at the 1980 Summer Olympics
1980 Summer Olympics
1980 in Costa Rican sport